Montézic is a commune in the Aveyron department in southern France.

Near the commune is the Montézic Power Station.

Charles de Louvrié, inventor of the jet engine, was born in the commune.

Population

See also
Communes of the Aveyron department

References

Communes of Aveyron
Aveyron communes articles needing translation from French Wikipedia